Nedunuru is a village in Ainavilli Mandal in East Godavari District of Andhra Pradesh, India.

References

Villages in East Godavari district